Cedar Creek is a rural locality in the Moreton Bay Region, Queensland, Australia.

Geography 

The mountainous terrain is mostly undeveloped.

Cedar Creek (the watercourse) rises in neighbouring Mount Glorious to the west and flows through the locality of Cedar Creek, exiting to Closeburn to the east. The valley floor is used for a mixture of rural residential housing and farming (predominantly grazing on native vegetation with some perennial horticulture).

Access into the locality of Cedar Creek is mostly via Cedar Creek Road from Closeburn with some parts of the north of the locality accessed via Herron Road also from Closeburn and a small area in the south-east of the locality accessed via Mayfield Road from neighbouring Samford Valley.

History
Prior to the creation of Moreton Bay Region in 2008, Cedar Creek was in Pine Rivers Shire.

Education 
There are no schools in Cedar Creek. The nearest government primary school is Mount Samson State School in neighbouring Mount Samson to the north-east. The nearest government secondary school is Ferny Grove State High School in Ferny Grove in the City of Brisbane to the south-east.

Amenities 
Andy Williams Park (also known as Cedar Creek Park) is off Cedar Creek Road. It has shallow creek pools.

Shopping and other services are available in Samford Village to the south-east.

Despite the name, Cedar Creek Public Hall is now within neighbouring Closeburn (near the watercourse Cedar Creek).

References

Suburbs of Moreton Bay Region
Localities in Queensland